Sputnik 2 (Satellite 2), or Prosteyshiy Sputnik 2 (PS-2, Simplest Satellite 2) was the second spacecraft launched into Earth orbit, on 3 November 1957, and the first to carry an animal into orbit, a Soviet space dog named Laika. Laika died on the fourth orbit due to overheating caused by an air conditioning malfunction.

It contained several compartments for radio transmitters, a telemetry system, a programming unit, a regeneration and temperature-control system for the cabin, and scientific instruments. A separate sealed cabin contained the dog Laika.

Engineering and biological data were transmitted using the Tral D telemetry system, transmitting data to Earth for a 15-minute period during each orbit. Two photometers were on board for measuring solar radiation (ultraviolet and x-ray emissions) and cosmic rays. A 100 line television camera provided images of Laika.
Sputnik 2 was launched into space only 32 days after its predecessor Sputnik 1. Due to the huge success of Sputnik 1, Nikita Khrushchev ordered Sergei Korolev back to work creating a Sputnik 2 that needed to be ready for space for the 40th anniversary of the Bolshevik revolution.

The plan for Sputnik 1 and Sputnik 2 was initiated and presented by Korolev, and was approved in January 1957. At that time, it was not clear that the Soviets' main satellite plan (which would eventually become Sputnik 3) would be able to get to space because of the ongoing issues with the R-7 ICBM, which would be needed to launch a satellite of that size. "Korolev proposed substituting two 'simple satellites' for the IGY satellite". The choice to launch these two instead of waiting for the more advanced Sputnik 3 to be finished was largely motivated by the desire to launch a satellite to orbit before the US.

Mission profile

Sputnik 2, known to Korolev's design bureau as "Prosteyshiy Sputnik-2", meaning "Simple Satellite 2", was launched into a  orbit with a period of 103.7 minutes on a modified ICBM R-7, similar to the one used to launch Sputnik 1.

Sputnik 2's launch vehicle had several modifications for the mission. These included modifying the launch trajectory to use propellant more efficiently and removing some flight control components to reduce weight. In addition, the core stage would be burned to propellant depletion instead of cutting off at a preset time. The telemetry system at engine cutoff would be switched from monitoring the booster's parameters to those of the capsule. It was also designed to only transmit data for ten minutes at a time every 90 minutes, so as to prevent battery power from being used up sending data while the spacecraft was out of range of Soviet tracking stations. The interstage section between the booster and capsule was highly polished and equipped with thermal blankets so as to reflect off sunlight and keep the latter cool; also, several deployable reflectors were mounted on the core stage. A braking nozzle was added to the core stage to prevent it from tumbling in orbit; this would work by venting excess helium gas from the propellant tank pressurization system. Several RD-107 engines were test-fired, with the best-performing units being selected for use on Sputnik 2's booster. The launch vehicle arrived at Baikonur on 22 October, along with various parts of the capsule. On 1 November, the booster was erected on LC-1.

Ten dogs were considered for the mission, with the final selection being narrowed down to three, Laika being the flight animal, Albina the backup, and Mushka used to test equipment.

Liftoff took place at about 17:30 Moscow time on 3 November. Booster performance was nominal and the command to terminate core stage thrust was issued at T+297 seconds, just as onboard sensors detected LOX depletion. The booster and capsule entered a  orbit at a 65° inclination.

During the first two orbits, it proved difficult to reliably track Sputnik 2's flight path, but ground controllers were able to intercept theodolite data from an American tracking station in Perth, Australia. Data showed that Laika's heart rate and breathing spiked rapidly during ascent, but she otherwise reached orbit largely unscathed. Official Soviet press releases stated that Laika survived a week in orbit, but information released in the post-Soviet era indicated that she died only a few hours into the mission. Other sources suggested it had been four days before the dog succumbed to overheating and carbon dioxide buildup.

Telemetry data indicated that Laika's vital signs were normal for the first three orbits, but during the fourth orbit, the cabin temperature rose to  followed by movements of the dog. Data received on the second day showed no signs of breathing, heart rate, or blood pressure, but the cardio sensor was still registering a heart beat. By the morning of 6 November, there were no signs of life in the capsule. On 10 November, the batteries in the spacecraft ran out and all data transmission ceased, after 150 separate telemetry sessions. Sputnik 2 reentered the atmosphere on 14 April 1958 after 162 days in space and about 2500 orbits. Reentry was sighted from the east coast of the United States and surviving debris impacted in the Amazon region of South America.

The flight sparked considerable ethical debate about cruelty to animals, as Laika had been launched with the full knowledge that she could not be recovered and may have suffered a quite unpleasant death from panic and overheating, and some Soviet space program officials reportedly felt sorry about her. An anonymously-written poem criticizing the mission and the Soviet state was circulated in Moscow.

The R-7 was also known by its GURVO designation 8K71, as well as the T-3, M-104, and Type A. The R-7 modified for the PS-2 satellite launch was designated 8k71PS. Unlike Sputnik 1, Sputnik 2 was not designed to detach from the R-7 sustainer core, since Sputnik 1's core stage had demonstrated an acceptable orbital lifespan. This allowed the core's Tral D telemetry system to be used to transmit data, but would lead to speculation that Sputnik 2 had failed to separate.

Passenger

The first living creature (larger than a microbe) to orbit the Earth (though not the first to reach space) was a female mongrel originally named Kudryavka (Little Curly), but later renamed Laika ("Barker"). Her true pedigree is unknown, although it is generally accepted that she was part husky or other Nordic breed, and possibly part terrier. NASA refers to Laika as a "part-Samoyed terrier". Laika was selected from ten candidates at the Air Force Institute of Aviation Medicine, because of her even temperament.

The pressurized cabin on Sputnik 2 was padded and allowed enough room for Laika to lie down or stand. An air regeneration system provided oxygen; food and water were dispensed in a gelatinized form. Laika was chained in place and fitted with a harness, a bag to collect waste, and electrodes to monitor vital signs.

Early telemetry indicated Laika was agitated but alive and well, although the cabin temperature had already reached  by the third orbit. Biometric telemetry failed sometime after the fourth orbit. It was initially claimed that Laika had survived in orbit for a week; decades later, Russian sources revealed that Laika likely had survived only a few hours in orbit before dying from overheating.

The mission provided scientists with the first data on the behavior of a living organism in the space environment. Although the time between Sputniks 1 and 2 was only 32 days, the plan to launch a dog was planned more than a year in advance. The Soviets already had significant experience launching dogs in high altitude rockets, and they used that experience when ordered to quickly get Sputnik 2 into space.

Impact 
The time after Sputnik 2 was tense for the Americans and exciting for the Soviets. The day after Sputnik 2 went into orbit the Gaither committee met with President Eisenhower to brief him on the current situation. The committee, like much of the U.S., seemed to be in a panic, afraid that they were falling so far behind the Soviets technologically that it would put them in danger of a strike using nuclear weapons.

Unlike most of the U.S., President Eisenhower kept calm through the time afterward just as he did after Sputnik 1 was launched. According to one of the president's aides, “The president's burning concern was to keep the country from going hog-wild and from embarking on foolish, costly schemes.” By this, he was referring to the push from the Gaither committee and others to invest in creating nuclear fallout shelters.

In the U.S.S.R., just six days after the launch of Sputnik 2, on the 40th anniversary of the October revolution, Khrushchev boasted in a speech “Now our first Sputnik is not lonely in its space travels.”

Sputnik 2 and the Van Allen radiation belt
The Van Allen radiation belt could have received the name "Vernov Belt" after S. N. Vernov from Moscow State University. Sputnik 2 detected the Earth's outer radiation belt in the far northern latitudes, but researchers did not immediately realize the significance of the elevated radiation because Sputnik 2 passed through the Van Allen belt too far out of range of the Soviet tracking stations.

In Australia, Professor Harry Messel intercepted the signals. Other stations in Australia and South America had also been in range and intercepted the signals. However, the Soviets would not release the code that would allow the stations in Australia and South America to read the signals, and without the code, the stations would not cooperate and send the data to the Soviets.

The disagreement cost the Soviets the opportunity to claim one of the most significant findings of the space race at that time, and only after the launch (1 February 1958) of the U.S. satellite Explorer 1 did James Van Allen demonstrate the existence of the radiation belts.
In 1958, with Sputnik 3, they began to cooperate, and they confirmed the findings of the U.S. satellites Explorer 1, 3, and 4.

Reentry 
Sputnik 2 reentered the Earth's atmosphere on 14 April 1958, at approximately 0200 hrs, on a line that stretched from New York to the Amazon. Its track was plotted by British ships and 3 "Moon Watch Observations", from New York. It was said to be glowing and did not develop a tail until it was at latitudes south of 20° North. The satellite burned up in the atmosphere.

Model
A USSR-built engineering model of the R-7 Sputnik 8K71PS (Sputnik II) is located at the Cosmosphere in Hutchinson, Kansas, USA.

See also

 Animals in space
 Timeline of artificial satellites and space probes

Footnotes

References 
 Bilstein, Roger E., Stages to Saturn a Technological History of the Apollo/Saturn Launch Vehicles, Washington, D.C., National Aeronautics and Space Administration, NASA SP 4206.
 Cox, Donald & Stoiko, Michael, Spacepower what it means to you, Philadelphia, Pennsylvania, The John C. Winston Company.
 Harford, James., Korolev, New York. John Wiley & Sons, Inc., .
 Siddiqi, Asif A., Sputnik and the Soviet Space Challenge, Gainesville, FL.  The University of Florida Press, .
 Swenson, L, Jr, Grimwood, J. M. Alexander, C.C., This New Ocean, A History of Project Mercury, Washington, D.C., National Aeronautics and Space Administration, Library of Congress Card No. 66-62424.
 Zaloga, Stephen J., The Kremlin's Nuclear Sword, Washington.  The Smithsonian Institution Press,  .
 Cox, D. W. (1962). The space race; from Sputnik to Apollo, and beyond. Philadelphia: Chilton Books. pg. 26, 32, 47, 118.
 King-Hele, D., & Walker, D. (1958). The Last Minutes of Satellite 1957β (Sputnik 2). Nature, 182 (4633), 426–427. 
 Logsdon, J. M., Launius, R. D., & Smith, R. W. (2000). Reconsidering Sputnik: Forty years since the Soviet satellite. Australia: Harwood Academic. Pg. - 86, 101.
 Roberts, W. (n.d.). Provocations # 36: The Van Allen radiation belts almost scooped | OpenSky Repository. Retrieved 10 April 2016, from https://opensky.ucar.edu/islandora/object/archives:1538 12 January 1985.
 Zak, A. (2016 April 9). Sputnik. Retrieved 10 April 2016, from  http://www.russianspaceweb.com/sputnik2.html

External links

Sputnik: 50 Years Ago
Anatoly Zak on Sputnik-2
Sputnik 2 Diary
NSSDC Master Catalog: Spacecraft Sputnik 2
Sputnik 2 at Astronautix

Biosatellites
Spacecraft launched in 1957
1957 in the Soviet Union
Earth observation satellites of the Soviet Union
Spacecraft which reentered in 1958
Soviet inventions
2
1958 in the Soviet Union
Animal testing in the Soviet Union